The 2022 UCI Urban Cycling World Championships are the fifth edition of the UCI Urban Cycling World Championships, and are held from 9 to 13 November 2021 in Abu Dhabi, United Arab Emirates.

The 2022 championships comprised events in freestyle BMX and trials.

Medal summary

Freestyle BMX

Flatland

Park

Trials

Medal table

See also
 2022 UCI BMX World Championships
 2022 UCI Mountain Bike World Championships
 2021 UCI Urban Cycling World Championships

References

External links

UCI
Event page on UCI website

UCI Urban Cycling World Championships
UCI Urban Cycling World Championships
UCI Urban Cycling World Championships
International cycle races hosted by the United Arab Emirates
Sports competitions in Abu Dhabi
UCI Urban Cycling World Championships